BTCL or Bangladesh Telecommunications Company Limited is the largest telecommunications company in Bangladesh. The company was founded as the Bangladesh Telegraph & Telephone Board (BTTB) following Bangladesh's independence in 1971. On July 1, 2008 the BTTB became a public limited company and was renamed as BTCL. The Bangladesh government initially owned all BTCL shares, but stated it would sell the shares to the public the following year. The value of BTCL is estimated to be at ৳15,000 crore (৳150 billion). BTCL has a total of 12,636 officials and staff.

BTCL provides land-line telephone services in Bangladesh's urban areas, including domestic long-distance calling and international services as well as internet services. In 2004, the Bangladesh Government issued a number of PSTN licenses to private companies, but they were barred from providing services in the lucrative Dhaka market (which accounts for the majority of the nationwide market). The monopoly held by BTCL was broken when other operators started to receive licenses from 2007.

History

Early history
The Telegraph branch under the Posts and Telegraph Department was created in 1853 in the then British India and was regulated afterwards under the Telegraph Act-1885. The Telegraph branch was reconstructed in 1962 in the then East Pakistan as Pakistan Telegraph and Telephone Department.

Post-independence

Following Bangladesh's independence, the Bangladesh Telegraph and Telephone Department was set up under the Ministry of Posts and Telecommunications in 1971. This was converted into a corporate body named 'Telegraph and Telephone Board' by promulgation of Telegraph and Telephone Board Ordinance, 1975. Pursuant to a 1979 ordinance, the Telegraph and Telephone Board was converted into a government board named the Bangladesh Telegraph and Telephone Board (BTTB).

Bangladesh Telecommunications Company Limited

On 1 July 2008, BTTB transformed to a government-owned Public Limited Company under a new name of Bangladesh Telecommunications Company Limited BTCL. BTCL has launched a 24-hour call centre for customers. Customers in Dhaka will be able to call the number and reach the BTCL for enquiry, according to a company media release. BTCL runs a red telephone exchange for the VIPs which is secured and always live.

Internet services

BTCL provides dial-up Internet access in all 64 districts of the country, making it the most-accessible Internet service provider in the country. As of January 2009 its total dial-up subscriber is 32,433. Since the beginning of 2007 BTCL have improved its Dial-up Internet service for better customer satisfaction. It also handles the .bd domain.

BTCL provides consumer-level broadband Internet services under the branding of BCUBE. The service is provided through ADSL2+ technology.
BTCL has outsourced its BCUBE sales and customer support to EMEM Systems Ltd, System & Services Ltd (SSL) and Sisview Technologies Ltd. Till now btcl have got about 15,000 customers. BTCL's monthly income about ৳19,000,000 per month from this service.

The state-owned telephony firm will develop a broadband wireless access network across the country soon with Korean help to provide uninterrupted upgraded services to its clients, officials said. Bangladesh Telecommunications Company Limited (BTCL) in cooperation with Korean Economic Development Cooperation Fund (EDCF) will establish the modern network.

Satellites
Bangladesh's first satellite on earth's orbit will have 40 transponders to provide telecommunications and broadcast services. US-based Space Partnership International (SPI) has already started designing the satellite and will also help launch it under a contract signed with the government. The two ground stations that will control the satellite will be built at Gazipur's Joydebpur and Rangamati's Betbunia on the land owned by Bangladesh Telecommunications Company Limited (BTCL). The government plans to have the satellite, named after the Father of the Nation Bangabandhu Sheikh Mujibur Rahman, sent to space by June 2017.

Bill defaults
BTCL Managing Director eng Mahfuz Uddin Ahmed said it undertook a scheme to realise the outstanding phone bills from government and private agencies, and general customers by giving them 5–6 months.
“If this flexible approach fails to realise the dues, we'll take legal action against the defaulters,” he added.
Mahfuz also said they were trying to realise outstanding phone bills of ৳1,062 crore (৳10.62 billion) from different international call carriers through legal procedure.
According to BTCL statistics, government agencies owe ৳102.46 crore, semi-govt organisations ৳12.10 crore, private agencies ৳313.18 crore, Bangladesh Railway ৳1.12 crore, and newspapers/agencies ৳1.17 crore to BTCL.
Besides, ৳247.65 crore have been due as some telephone lines were disconnected due to non-payment of bills.
Moreover, 15 foreign private carriers (pre-paid system) have a total of ৳10.93 crore due to BTCL, while 52 foreign private carriers (post-paid system) ৳989.11 crore and 26 national foreign carriers ৳73.55 crore.
BTCL Director (international) Sharifuzzaman said international calls enter Bangladesh using BTCL's network and the call carriers have to pay ৳1.5 cent per minute.

Graft and controversy
Bangladesh Telecommunications Company Limited (BTCL) suffered revenue loss of at least ৳2,000 crore in last six years due to corruption, revealed a TIB study April 31, 2014. Transparency International Bangladesh (TIB) identified tampering with the BTCL's international call records as one of its major corrupted areas.
Bangladesh's state-owned telecommunications company is refusing to reconnect a British firm to the country's network despite having been ordered to do so by the courts. London-based Zamir Telecom has been cut off from the Bangladesh network since March, causing it significant financial damage. Bangladesh's controversial telecoms minister, Abdul Latif Siddique, has admitted giving the order for the disconnection of Zamir Telecom from the Bangladesh Telecommunications Company Limited (BTCL). This was in breach of a 2010 court order overturning a similar situation. Zamir Telecom successfully challenged BTCL in a Dhaka court in early May when judges ordered the firm's reconnection within 36 hours. But the court order was ignored again. This is purportedly because of an ongoing arbitration process between BTCL and Zamir Telecom over disputed invoicing, despite judges saying the connection must be maintained alongside the talks.
The Anti-Corruption Commission on August 25, 2013 approved filing four cases against 22 people, including Managing Director SOM Kalim Ullah and three other former managing directors of Bangladesh Telecommunications Company Limited, in connection with embezzling over ৳5.75bn through illegal Voice over Internet Protocol business. ACC Commissioner M Shahabuddin said the commission had approved filing the cases at a recent meeting. "Since we have found their involvement in the graft allegation the commission has taken the decision." BTCL Managing Director SOM Kalim Ullah, former managing directors SM Khabiruzzaman, Afsar-ul-Alam and AM Abu Sayed Khan, former member (maintenance and operation) Mohammad Tawfiq, former divisional engineers Ronel Chakma and Habibur Rahman Pramanik, Ericsson Bangladesh Ltd's Contract Manager Asif Jahid, Relation Manager Nazrul Islam and engineer Masrurul Hakim will be made accused in the cases. ACC officials said the BTCL officials in connivance with Ericsson Bangladesh Ltd embezzled the money by erasing incoming international call minutes from call detail record of ITX-5 and ITX-7.

References

External links

 Official website 

Telecommunications companies of Bangladesh
1971 establishments in Bangladesh
Government-owned companies of Bangladesh
Organisations based in Dhaka